The 2019 GT Series Endurance Cup (known for sponsorship reasons as the 2019 Blancpain GT Series Endurance Cup)was the ninth season of the GT Series Endurance Cup. The season began on 14 April at Monza and ended on 29 September in Barcelona. The season featured five rounds, with each race lasting for a duration of three hours besides the 24 Hours of Spa and the 1000 km Paul Ricard events.

Calendar
At the annual press conference during the 2018 24 Hours of Spa on 27 July, the Stéphane Ratel Organisation announced the first draft of the 2019 calendar. The World Challenge Europe round at the Nürburgring would become an Endurance Cup round, replacing the round in Barcelona, before the two tracks were swapped around again in the final draft of the calendar released on 22 October.

Entry list

Race results
Bold indicates overall winner.

Championship standings
Scoring system
Championship points are awarded for the first ten positions in each race. The pole-sitter also receives one point and entries are required to complete 75% of the winning car's race distance in order to be classified and earn points. Individual drivers are required to participate for a minimum of 25 minutes in order to earn championship points in any race.

Race points

1000 km Paul Ricard points

24 Hours of Spa points
Points are awarded after six hours, after twelve hours and at the finish.

Drivers' championships

Overall

Silver Cup

Pro-Am Cup

Notes
1 – Charlie Eastwood, Ahmad Al Harthy and Salih Yoluç lost the point for Pole position after a breach of article 19.6, after the gantry camera card was not submitted in time.

Am Cup

Teams' championships

Overall

Silver Cup

Pro-Am Cup

Notes
1 – Oman Racing with TF Sport lost the point for Pole position after a breach of article 19.6, after the gantry camera card was not submitted in time.

Am Cup

See also
2019 GT Series
2019 GT World Challenge America
2019 GT World Challenge Asia
2019 GT World Challenge Europe

Notes

References

External links

Endurance Cup